Napoleon Richard Hairston (August 22, 1912 – January 26, 1980) was an American Negro league outfielder in the 1930s.

A native of Winston-Salem, North Carolina, Hairston attended Winston-Salem State University. He played for the Pittsburgh Crawfords in 1938, posting 29 hits with two home runs and 18 RBI in 153 plate appearances over 37 recorded games. Hairston died in Johnston County, North Carolina in 1980 at age 67.

References

External links
 and Baseball-Reference Black Baseball Stats and Seamheads

1912 births
1980 deaths
Pittsburgh Crawfords players
Baseball outfielders
Baseball players from Winston-Salem, North Carolina
20th-century African-American sportspeople